Bock is a city in Mille Lacs County, Minnesota, United States. The population was 106 at the 2010 census.

History
A post office called Bock was established in 1892. Bock was named by railroad officials.

Geography

Minnesota Highway 23 serves as a main route in the community.

Transportation
  MN 23
  Mille Lacs County Road 1
  Mille Lacs County Road 110

Demographics

2010 census
As of the census of 2010, there were 106 people, 46 households, and 28 families residing in the city. The racial makeup of the city was 96.2% White, 1.9% Asian, 0.9% from other races, and 0.9% from two or more races. Hispanic or Latino of any race were 1.9% of the population.

There were 46 households, of which 28.3% had children under the age of 18 living with them, 43.5% were married couples living together, 10.9% had a female householder with no husband present, 6.5% had a male householder with no wife present, and 39.1% were non-families. 30.4% of all households were made up of individuals, and 10.8% had someone living alone who was 65 years of age or older. The average household size was 2.30 and the average family size was 2.75.

The median age in the city was 44.3 years. 21.7% of residents were under the age of 18; 10.4% were between the ages of 18 and 24; 19.8% were from 25 to 44; 38.6% were from 45 to 64; and 9.4% were 65 years of age or older. The gender makeup of the city was 52.8% male and 47.2% female.

2000 census
As of the census of 2000, there were 106 people, 46 households, and 31 families residing in the city. The racial makeup of the city was 99.06% White, 0.94% from other races. Hispanic or Latino of any race were 2.83% of the population.

There were 46 households, out of which 23.9% had children under the age of 18 living with them, 50.0% were married couples living together, 8.7% had a female householder with no husband present, and 32.6% were non-families. 28.3% of all households were made up of individuals, and 13.0% had someone living alone who was 65 years of age or older. The average household size was 2.22 and the average family size was 2.68.

In the city, the population was spread out, with 17.9% under the age of 18, 10.4% from 18 to 24, 25.5% from 25 to 44, 28.3% from 45 to 64, and 17.9% who were 65 years of age or older. The median age was 44 years. For every 100 females, there were 125.5 males. For every 100 females age 18 and over, there were 117.5 males.

The median income for a household in the city was $31,250, and the median income for a family was $38,750. Males had a median income of $41,250 versus $21,250 for females. The per capita income for the city was $14,806. There were 6.1% of families and 9.3% of the population living below the poverty line, including 21.1% of under eighteens and 13.0% of those over 64.

References

Cities in Minnesota
Cities in Mille Lacs County, Minnesota
1892 establishments in Minnesota
Populated places established in 1892